Brocchinia gilmartiniae is a species of plant in the genus Brocchinia. This species is endemic to the State of Bolívar in southeastern Venezuela. It is named for US botanist Amy Jean Gilmartin (1932-1989).

References

gilmartiniae
Endemic flora of Venezuela
Plants described in 1986